Marquis  was an admiral in the Imperial Japanese Navy in World War II.

Born as HIH Kitashirakawa-no-miya Teruhisa, as the younger son of HIH Prince Kitashirakawa Yoshihisa, his title was devolved from royal status that that of the kazoku peerage in 1910 in order to preserve the Komatsu family line, which had become extinct with the death of Prince Komatsu Akihito in 1908.

Biography
Komatsu graduated from the 37th class of the Imperial Japanese Naval Academy in 1909 ranked 26th out of 179 cadets. He performed his midshipman training on the cruiser , and after commissioning as an ensign, he served as a crewman on the battleship .

In 1913, he took time out from the navy to fulfill the obligation of members of his social class to sit for a session in the House of Peers. He later served on the cruiser  and battlecruiser .

After graduating from the Naval War College (Japan) in 1919, Komatsu was promoted to lieutenant commander. He subsequently served in a number of staff positions, and traveled to the United Kingdom for further studies in 1925 for over two years at his own expense, during which time he was promoted to commander. After his return to Japan, he received his first command: the destroyer  from 1 April 1927 – 1 December 1927. He was subsequently executive officer on the cruiser  in 1929, and then battleship  in 1930.

Promoted to captain on 1 December 1930, Komatsu commanded minelayer  in 1931, submarine tender  in 1932, light cruiser  in 1933, and heavy cruiser  in 1935.

After his promotion to rear admiral on 1 December 1936, Komatsu commanded the 1st Submarine Squadron (SubRon 1) in 1937, and was Commandant of the Kure Submarine Warfare School in 1937.

As a vice admiral from 15 November 1940, Komatsu commanded the Ryojun Guard District in 1941, and was commander-in-chief of the 1st China Expeditionary Fleet from 5 July 1941. After the outbreak of the Pacific War in December 1941, he was reassigned as commander-in-chief of the 6th Fleet, effectively controlling Japanese submarine operations, from 16 March 1942 to 21 June 1943, including during the Battle of Midway in June 1942 and the Guadalcanal campaign of August 1942–February 1943. From June 1943 to November 1944, he was commander of the Sasebo Naval District. In the last part of 1944, he was Commandant of the Imperial Japanese Naval Academy. He retired from active service in May 1945.

References

Books

External links

Notes

1888 births
1970 deaths
Kazoku
Imperial Japanese Navy admirals
Japanese admirals of World War II
Battle of Midway